Indigo is the fourth studio album by American indie rock act Wild Nothing, released on August 30, 2018 on Captured Tracks.

Critical reception

Track listing

References

2018 albums
Captured Tracks albums
Wild Nothing albums